EP is an extended play by American alternative rock band Matchbox Twenty. The EP comprises six songs, five of them being live and acoustic versions of songs from the band's previous three albums. The final track is the previously unreleased "Suffer Me", which was later included as a bonus track on the iTunes reissue of Mad Season. EP also includes an enhanced CD of a performance by the band at The Troubadour.

Track listing

Charts

References

2003 EPs
Matchbox Twenty albums